The Hundred of Palmer is a cadastral hundred of the County of Newcastle in South Australia. It is 
located near 32.195°S, 138.215°E east of the township of Quorn, and south of the former town of Willochra which, although surveyed in 1860, never properly developed and was abandoned during the drought in the 1860s.

The traditional owners of the area are the Ngadjuri people. The first European explorer to the area was Thomas Burr in September 1842.

References

Palmer